The history of the Jews in Sierra Leone date back at least to the 15th century, when Sephardi Jewish traders and explorers arrived in the region from Portugal.

History
During the late 15th century and early 16th century, Portuguese Jews escaping religious persecution in Portugal during the Portuguese Inquisition formed Jewish communities along the coasts of the Upper Guinea from, Sierra Leone to Senegal. These Portuguese settlers, known as lançados, married local African women and formed families. These mixed-race Black Sephardi communities are often known as Luso-Africans. Much early commerce in Sierra Leone was conducted by lançados who sailed to and from the region to S. Domingos, located north of present-day Bissau. Mixed-race Black Sephardi Jews in the region were referred to as filhos de terra and were generally considered "Portuguese".

A small of number of European and American Jews settled in the British Sierra Leone Colony and Protectorate between 1831 and 1934. Some of the Jewish merchants who settled in Sierra Leone were an important part of the colonial European population and helped pioneer European commerce in the hinterlands of Sierra Leone.

See also

Jews of Bilad el-Sudan
Lançados
Luso-Africans

References

External links
Sierra Leone, Chabad of Central Africa
Sierra Leone, Jews Were Here

American-Jewish diaspora
European-Jewish diaspora
Jews and Judaism in West Africa
Religion in Sierra Leone
Portuguese-Jewish diaspora in Africa
Sephardi Jewish culture in Africa